Charles Carl "Heinie" Berger (January 7, 1882 – February 10, 1954) was an American professional baseball pitcher. Berger played in Major League Baseball (MLB) for four seasons for the Cleveland Naps (1907–1910).

Biography

Berger, a native of Greenfield, Indiana, started his professional baseball career with the Spring Lake Park semi-pro team. In 1905 and 1906 he won 25 and 28 games respectively with the Columbus Senators of the American Association before coming to the majors.

He made his major league debut May 6, 1907, and played his final game on July 22, 1910. His best years were 1908 and 1909, with Berger winning 13 games in each of those seasons.  He started 68 games for the Naps and ended his career with a 32–29 win loss record and a 2.60 earned run average.

In 1909, he led all American League pitchers, striking out an average of 5.90 batters per 9-innings pitched.  He struck out a total of 162 batters in 1909, 3rd in the American League.  Berger also led the league in wild pitches in 1909 with 13.

"Heinie" was a popular nickname for German baseball players in the early part of the 20th century.  Berger was one of 22 major league Heinie's in the first half of the century.  Others include: Heinie Beckendorf (1909–1910); Heinie Groh (1912–1927); Heinie Manush (1923–1939) (the only Hall of Fame "Heinie"); Heinie Meine (1922–1934); Heinie Mueller (1920–1935); Heinie Mueller (1938–1941); Heinie Peitz (1892–1913); Heinie Reitz (1893–1899); Heinie Sand (1923–1928); Heinie Schuble (1927–1936); Heinie Smith (1897–1903); Heinie Stafford (1914); Heinie Wagner (1902–1918); and Heinie Zimmerman (1907–1919).  No major league player has been known by the nickname "Heinie" since World War II.

Berger is buried at Lake View Cemetery Cuyahoga County, Ohio.

References

External links

 

1882 births
1954 deaths
People from LaSalle, Illinois
Cleveland Naps players
Major League Baseball pitchers
Baseball players from Illinois
Sportspeople from Lakewood, Ohio
Columbus Senators players
Mobile Sea Gulls players
Nashville Vols players
Burials at Lake View Cemetery, Cleveland